Ilez Akhmedovich Gazdiyev (born 2 November 1991) is a Russian former professional football player.

Club career
He made his Russian Football National League debut for FC Angusht Nazran on 7 July 2013 in a game against FC Neftekhimik Nizhnekamsk.

External links
 
 

1991 births
Living people
Russian footballers
Association football midfielders
FC Angusht Nazran players